RAF Graveley is a former Royal Air Force station located  south of Huntingdon. The station was originally intended to operate under No. 3 Group RAF, alongside RAF Tempsford and RAF Gransden Lodge.

Station history
Work on the site started in 1941, and it was opened as an operational base in March 1942 with No. 161 Squadron flying Lysander aircraft under No. 3 Group RAF, until it transferred to the Pathfinder Force with No. 35 Squadron in August 1942. Originally, the base was intended for special operations and would have operated alongside RAF Tempsford and RAF Gransden Lodge. No. 35 Sqn (No. XXXV Squadron) arrived in August 1942 using the Handley Page Halifax (which it had used since 1940) it became a pathfinder unit, forming part of No. 8 Group. In March 1944 the squadron re-equipped with the Avro Lancaster and continued at Graveley until it was posted to RAF Stradishall in September 1946. During November 1945, Michael Beetham, then a Squadron Leader, was posted onto the squadron.

In 1943, RAF Graveley was the one of the first operational stations to use of the fog dispersal system FIDO. It was tested in July of that year with fog being burnt off and visibility vastly increased, though the descending aircraft had to cope with turbulence caused by the heated air from the burning fog. In November 1943, the first operational use of the FIDO system saw four Halifax aircraft of No. 35 Sqn landing in fog after a bombing operation.

No. 692 Squadron was formed on 1 January 1944 at RAF Graveley, equipped with Mosquito IV bombers, as part of the Light Night Striking Force of No. 8 Group RAF in Bomber Command. It re-equipped with the Mosquito XVI bombers in March.

No. 227 Squadron moved to Graveley from Strubby in June 1945, and was disbanded here on 5 September 1945.

Post-war, the airfield was used as a relief landing ground for No. 206 Advanced Flying School and No. 5 Flying Training School which were based at RAF Oakington. The airfield was closed in December 1968.

In popular culture

Part of the filming for the 1967 movie picture "'Robbery" (which was based on the  Great Train Robbery) was filmed at the airfield with a number of exterior shots showing parts of the airfield.

Current use
The airfield is mostly agriculture with a few buildings surviving. A wind farm was built on the site in the 2010s.

References

Sources

External links

 http://www.raf.mod.uk/history/692squadron.cfm

Royal Air Force stations in Huntingdonshire
Royal Air Force stations in Cambridgeshire
Royal Air Force stations of World War II in the United Kingdom